Marie Michele St. Louis (born 16 November 1968) is a Mauritian judoka. She competed in the women's half-heavyweight event at the 1996 Summer Olympics.

References

External links
 

1968 births
Living people
Mauritian female judoka
Olympic judoka of Mauritius
Judoka at the 1996 Summer Olympics
Place of birth missing (living people)